is the northern portion of Gifu Prefecture in the Chūbu region of Japan. The Hida region received its name because the area was formerly part of Hida Province, before the formation of prefectures in Japan. The borders of this region are not officially set, but it generally consists of the following four municipalities: Takayama, Hida, Gero and Shirakawa.

Climate

The Hida region has a humid continental climate, with very warm summers and long, cold, very snowy winters. Some of the highest levels of snowfall in Japan are found in the north-western fringes of this region annually amounting to in excess of 10 meters, for example Shirakawa.

Demographics 
Per Japanese census data, Hida (Northern) portion of Gifu prefecture has had negative population growth since 1950

Hida was the largest city in Hida area until 1950 when it was surpassed by Takayama. The population peak of Hida area was around 200,000 in 1950.

See also
Seinō
Gifu
Chūnō
Tōnō

References

Chūbu region
Geography of Gifu Prefecture